The Cornelius O'Connor House near Homer, Nebraska, United States, was built in 1875.  It was listed on the National Register of Historic Places in 1977.

The house is owned by the Dakota County Historical Society and is open in the summer or by appointment.

References

Houses in Dakota County, Nebraska
Houses completed in 1875
Houses on the National Register of Historic Places in Nebraska
Italianate architecture in Nebraska
Museums in Dakota County, Nebraska
Historic house museums in Nebraska
National Register of Historic Places in Dakota County, Nebraska